is a professional Japanese baseball player. He plays infielder for the Hanshin Tigers.

External links

 NPB.com

1986 births
Living people
Baseball people from Shizuoka Prefecture
Japanese baseball players
Nippon Professional Baseball infielders
Yokohama BayStars players
Yokohama DeNA BayStars players
Hanshin Tigers players
Japanese baseball coaches
Nippon Professional Baseball coaches